A pedicure is a cosmetic treatment of the feet and toenails, analogous to a manicure. 

Pedicures include care not only for the toenails; dead skin cells are rubbed off the bottom of the feet using a rough stone (often a pumice stone). Skincare is often provided up to the knee, including granular exfoliation, moisturizing, and massage.

The word pedicure is derived from the Latin words pedis, which means "of the foot", and cura, which means "care".

History
People have been pedicuring their nails for more than 4,000 years. In southern Babylonia, noblemen used solid gold tools to give themselves manicures and pedicures. The use of fingernail polish can be traced back even further. Originating in China in 3000 BC, nail colour indicated one’s social status, according to a Ming Dynasty manuscript; royal fingernails were painted black and red. Ancient Egyptians have been manicuring all the way back to 2300 BC.

A depiction of early manicures and pedicures was found on a carving from a pharaoh’s tomb, and the Egyptians were known for paying special attention to their feet and legs. The Egyptians also colored their nails, using red to show the highest social class. It is said that Cleopatra’s nails were painted a deep red, whereas Queen Nefertiti went with a flashier ruby shade. In ancient Egypt and Rome, military commanders also painted their nails to match their lips before they went off to battle.

Pedicures in the United States
Pedicures generally take approximately 45 minutes to an hour in the US. 
According to the US Department of Labor, manicure and pedicure specialists earned a median income of around $20,820 in 2015. Most professionals earn an hourly wage or salary which can be augmented through customer tips. Independent nail stylists depend on repeat business and consistent business to earn their livings. The most successful independent manicure technicians may earn salaries of over $50,000 per year. Nail stylists can earn up to $100 per hour  from performing more technical nail treatments, such as pink and whites and sculpting. Although these treatments are not particularly popular for the feet, they are, nonetheless, an available option should anyone wish to have such a treatment. A standard pedicure treatment usually costs around $40.

Tools and nail cosmetics

Tools
 Acetone
 Cotton balls
 Cuticle cream
 Cuticle pusher or Cuticle nipper
 Foot bath
 Lotion
 Nail Buffer
 Nail file
 Nail polish
 Orange woodstick
 Toenail clippers
 Toe Spacers
 Towels
 Pedicure Spa
 Pumice stone (removes dead skin from sole of foot)
 Paper towels (rolled between toes to separate them)
Nail cosmetics
Base coat
Cuticle creams
Cuticle oil
Cuticle remover
Dry nail polish
Liquid nail polish
Nail bleach
Nail conditioner
Nail dryer
Nail polish remover
Nail polish thinner

Types of pedicures
There are various different types of pedicures. Some of the most common types are as follows (names and products may vary from spa to spa):

Regular pedicure: A simple treatment that includes foot soaking, foot scrubbing with a pumice stone or foot file, nail clipping, nail shaping, foot and calf massage, moisturizer and nail polishing.
Shanghai pedicure: A traditional foot medicine deriving from Chinese medicine that involves soaking feet in hot water and using a scalpel.
Spa pedicure:  Includes the regular pedicure and generally adds one of the following- Paraffin dip, masks, mud or seaweed treatment.
Dry or Waterless pedicure: A pedicure typically including nail shaping, cuticle cleanup, callus smoothing, moisturizer with massage, nail polish or buffing, but definitively without soaking the feet in water. Often the callus smoothing, nail shaping, and cuticle cleaning are all performed with an electric file.
Paraffin pedicure: A treatment that includes a regular pedicure but also includes the use of paraffin wax. The feet are covered with layers of paraffin wax to moisturize feet.
Stone pedicure: Basically a foot massage that involves the use of different essential oils that are rubbed with the help of hot stones for the massage of the feet and legs.
French pedicure: A regular pedicure that involves the use of white polish on the nail tips with a sheer pink color on the base.
Mini pedicure:  This focuses mainly on the toes with a quick soak, nail shaping and polish, but does not include the massage or sole care.  This is designed for an appointment between regular pedicures for generally well maintained feet.
Athletic pedicure:  Similar to a regular pedicure for both the genders. It includes either a clear polish or toenail buffing. Usually, the aromatics used will be more cooling, such as peppermint, cucumber, or eucalyptus.
Chocolate pedicure:  A pedicure which may include a chocolate foot soak, chocolate foot mask, or chocolate moisturizing lotion.
Ice Cream pedicure:  A pedicure where a "bath ball", which looks like a scoop of ice cream, is chosen.  The soak is followed with a foot scrub (usually vanilla, chocolate, or strawberry) and topped with a whipped moisturizing lotion. Red nail polish simulates the ice cream's "cherry".
Margarita pedicure: A regular pedicure which includes a salt scrub, soaking water with fresh limes, a lime-based massage oil, and moisturizer.
Champagne or Wine pedicure:  This is a regular pedicure usually featuring a grape-seed scrub, grape mask peel, and finished off with a grape seed oil or moisturizing massage.

Warnings
Most places use a pumice stone or a PedEgg-type device to shave off calluses. If calluses are shaved too aggressively and the skin is broken, this can become a portal for bacteria or fungus. This is especially problematic for diabetics, who need specialized foot care.
Solutions and chemicals used to cleanse or soak feet may cause skin irritation.
There can be a risk of developing an ingrown toenail from improper trimming.
Instruments may not be sterilized and can thus pass on fungal or bacterial cells. Fungi are easily transmittable from one person to another. These organisms can live for days on objects, especially if not properly cleaned.

References

External links

 Pedicure Soothes and Tingles, Leaving Manliness Intact, New York Times, April 2006
 Preventing Pedicure Foot Spa Infections, The United States Environmental Protection Agency
 Cosmetology Administrative Rules, Texas Department of Licensing and Regulation

Nail care
Foot
Body modification